Robert George Medcalf (17 July 1887 – 9 June 1963) was an Australian politician, elected as a member of the New South Wales Legislative Assembly.

Medcalf was the member for Lachlan from 1947 to 1950 and the member for Dubbo from 1950 to 1953.

Notes

 

Members of the New South Wales Legislative Assembly
1887 births
1963 deaths
National Party of Australia members of the Parliament of New South Wales
20th-century Australian politicians